F.P. Felix Avenue, also called by its former name Imelda Avenue, is a four-lane major road which connects Marcos Highway to Ortigas Avenue Extension. It is one of the busiest roads in Cainta, Rizal, Philippines. The road is named after Francisco P. Felix, a former mayor of Cainta. It also serves as a boundary of Cainta and Pasig. Felix Avenue was highly accessible by jeepneys, taxis, UV express, tricycles and private vehicles.

Landmarks
Sta. Lucia East, Q. Plaza, ICCT College Cainta, Charm Residences, Greenpark Executive Village in Pasig and Karangalan Village in Cainta are the well-known landmarks in this road.

References

Roads in Rizal
Roads in Metro Manila